Isaac Herzog 
 Tzipi Livni
 Shelly Yachimovich
 Stav Shaffir
 Itzik Shmuli
 Omer Bar-Lev
 Yehiel Bar
 Amir Peretz 
 Merav Michaeli 
 Eitan Cabel
 Manuel Trajtenberg
 Erel Margalit
 Mickey Rosenthal
 Revital Swid
 Danny Atar
 Yoel Hasson
 Zouheir Bahloul
 Eitan Broshi
 Michal Biran
 Nachman Shai
 Ksenia Svetlova
 Ayelet Nahmias-Verbin
 Yossi Yona
 Eyal Ben-Reuven
 Yael Cohen Paran
 Saleh Saad
 Leah Fadida
 Robert Tibayev
 Moshe Mizrahi
 Eldad Yaniv
 Asheret Bahira Berdugo
 Gilad Kariv
 Ariel Eitan Schwartz
 Ellis Florentina Goldman
 Alon Pilz
 Shimon Brown
 Chaya Cohen
 Nazar Aalimi
 Ibrahim Abu Sabih
 Solomon Trudy
 Lior Carmel
 Lemuel Melamed
 Mark "Marco" Serbia
 Alon Giladi
 Zahava Ailani
 Simon Alfassi
 Uri Keidar
 Nikola Masad
 Israel Ziv
 Richard Peres
 Sigal Moran
 Adir Vishniya
 Farhan Abu Riyashi
 Yamin Suissa
 Daniel Amnon
 Zohar Neumark
 Nir Shardatzki
 Julius Madler
 Naah Golani
 Emanuel Shahaf
 Boris Eisenberg
 Shulamit Ashbol
 Mihal Silberberg
 Roberto Nathanson Goldstrum
 Joseph Attia
 Pathi Amara
 Yehezkel Engler
 Shalom Kotler
 Almog Adonsky
 Samuel Mizrahi
 Ayal Ostrinski
 Joseph Vanunu
 Eliyahu Sadan
 Amiram Strolob
 Eli Eliyahu Oren
 Mishel Halimi
 Samuel Bezaleli
 Shalom Moyal
 Shulamit Shula Cohen
 Daniel Azoulay
 David Magen
 Zion Adiri 
 Roei Ben-David
 Ali Shivli
 Moshe Pines Tomer 
 Debbie Zahavi Ben-Ami
 Yitzchak Isaac Cholavski
 Dan Bilker 
 Ibrahim Abu Ras
 Israel Hirschhorn
 Avraham Dagani
 Orah Haham
 David Arieli
 Yael Miriam Sinai
 Moshe Ben Atar
 Tzvi Magen
 Tal Yechezkel Elovitzi
 Tamar Shahori
 Ehud Sutzkever
 Ilana Pinto
 Doron Sapir
 Isaac Yemini
 Amnon Zach
 Arik Hadad
 Michael Mordechai Biton
 Alon Natan Schuster
 Shlomo Bohbot
 Adi Eldar
 Eli Amir
 Shimon Shetreet
 Ophir Pines-Paz
 Ronen Cohen
 Uzi Baram
 Avraham Shochat
 Shevach Weiss
 David Libai
 Moshe Shahal
 Aharon Yadlin
 Shlomo Hillel
 Yitzhak Navon

External links
Central Elections Committee Official Zionist Camp List

Lists of Israeli politicians